Crioa is a genus of moths of the family Erebidae. The genus was erected by Francis Walker in 1858. It is found in Australia.

Species
 Crioa acronyctoides Walker, [1858]
 Crioa aroa Bethune-Baker, 1908
 Crioa hades Lower, 1903
 Crioa indistincta Walker, 1865

References

Calpinae